Beccari is an Italian surname. Notable people with the surname include:

Andrea Beccari (born 1978), Italian freestyle swimmer
Jacopo Bartolomeo Beccari (1682-1766), Italian physician and chemist
Maria Teresa Beccari (1950), Sanmarinese politician and mayor 
Odoardo Beccari (1843-1920), Italian naturalist

Italian-language surnames